Chaetodipus is a genus of pocket mouse containing 17 species endemic to the United States and Mexico. Like other members of their family such as pocket mice in the genus Perognathus, they are more closely related to pocket gophers than to true mice.

Characteristics
Members of this genus range in size from 80 to 125 mm (head and body) and weigh 15–47 grams (Nowak, 1999). Unlike the silky pocket mice (genus Perognathus), most species of the genus Chaetodipus have harsh pelage with some bordering on spiny hair. They tend to be found in arid habitats where they feed on seeds, vegetation, and insects (Nowak, 1999). Females give birth to a litter of 2–9 young after a gestation period of just under a month. The longest recorded life span is 8 years and 4 months (Nowak, 1999).

Species
Chaetodipus arenarius – Little desert pocket mouse
Chaetodipus artus – Narrow-skulled pocket mouse
Chaetodipus baileyi – Bailey's pocket mouse
Chaetodipus californicus – California pocket mouse
Chaetodipus dalquesti – Dalquest's pocket mouse
Chaetodipus eremicus – Chihuahuan pocket mouse
Chaetodipus fallax – San Diego pocket mouse
Chaetodipus formosus – Long-tailed pocket mouse
Chaetodipus goldmani – Goldman's pocket mouse
Chaetodipus hispidus – Hispid pocket mouse
Chaetodipus intermedius – Rock pocket mouse
Chaetodipus lineatus – Lined pocket mouse
Chaetodipus nelsoni – Nelson's pocket mouse
Chaetodipus penicillatus – Desert pocket mouse
Chaetodipus pernix – Sinaloan pocket mouse
Chaetodipus rudinoris – Baja pocket mouse
Chaetodipus spinatus – Spiny pocket mouse

Sometimes members of the genus Chaetodipus are placed in the genus Perognathus.

Footnotes

References
Nowak, Ronald M. 1999. Walker's Mammals of the World, 6th edition. Johns Hopkins University Press, 1936 pp. 

 
Rodent genera
Taxa named by Clinton Hart Merriam